Jezerce pri Šmartnem is a small settlement in the City Municipality of Celje in eastern Slovenia. It lies on the northern outskirts of Celje. The area is part of the traditional region of Styria. It is now included with the rest of the municipality in the Savinja Statistical Region.

Name
The name of the settlement was changed from Jezerce to Jezerce pri Šmartnem in 1953.

References

External links
Jezerce pri Šmartnem on Geopedia

Populated places in the City Municipality of Celje